Ernest Kesler (31 July 1931) is a former professional Soviet football forward and coach.

Notes

References

External links
 

1931 births
2004 deaths
Sportspeople from Uzhhorod
People from Carpathian Ruthenia
Ukrainian people of Hungarian descent
Soviet people of Hungarian descent
Ukrainian footballers
Soviet footballers
SKA Lviv players
FC Hoverla Uzhhorod players
Soviet football managers
Ukrainian football managers
LVVPU Lviv managers
SKA Lviv managers
SC Lutsk managers
FC Hoverla Uzhhorod managers
Association football forwards